St. Paul Camp Ground, also known as St. Paul A.M.E. Camp Ground, is a historic African Methodist Episcopal camp meeting and national historic district located near Harleyville, Dorchester County, South Carolina. The district encompasses 43 contributing buildings. It was established about 1880, and the buildings and grounds are used for one week each year. The tabernacle is a one-story building clad in rough-sawn weatherboard. Also on the property are 54 tents, two stores, and a storage house.

It was added to the National Register of Historic Places in 1998.

See also 
 Camp Welfare: AME Zion camp meeting ground in Fairfield County, South Carolina
 Cattle Creek Campground: United Methodist camp meeting ground in Orangeburg County, South Carolina
 Cypress Camp Ground: Methodist camp meeting ground in Dorchester County, South Carolina
 Indian Fields Campground: Methodist camp meeting ground in Dorchester County, South Carolina
 Mount Carmel Campground: AME Zion camp meeting ground in Lancaster County, South Carolina

References

African-American history of South Carolina
Methodism in South Carolina
Properties of religious function on the National Register of Historic Places in South Carolina
Historic districts on the National Register of Historic Places in South Carolina
National Register of Historic Places in Dorchester County, South Carolina
Camp meeting grounds
Campgrounds in South Carolina
African Methodist Episcopal Church